Raymond Bates Watson (December 10, 1898 – September 7, 1974) was an American track and field athlete who competed in the 1920 Summer Olympics, in the 1924 Summer Olympics, and in the 1928 Summer Olympics.

He was born in Garden City, Kansas and died in Quincy, Illinois. At the age of thirteen lost his right hand in a shooting accident.  Was occasionally referred to (erroneously) as "the one-arm wonder" Attended Kansas State where he is remembered as the first "Kansas Miler"

In 1920 he finished eighth in the 3000 metre steeplechase competition. Four years later he finished seventh in the 1500 metres event. At the 1928 Olympics he finished ninth in the 800 metres competition.

References

External links
 
 
 

1898 births
1974 deaths
People from Garden City, Kansas
Track and field athletes from Kansas
American male middle-distance runners
American male steeplechase runners
Olympic track and field athletes of the United States
Athletes (track and field) at the 1920 Summer Olympics
Athletes (track and field) at the 1924 Summer Olympics
Athletes (track and field) at the 1928 Summer Olympics